James Frawley (1936–2019) was an American director and actor.

James Frawley may also refer to:
 James Frawley (footballer) (born 1988), Australian rules footballer
 James Frawley (tennis) (born 1994), Australian tennis player
 James J. Frawley (1867–1926), American politician from New York